Gunnar Wennerström (June 27, 1879 – 1931) was a Swedish water polo player and freestyle swimmer who competed in the 1908 Summer Olympics.

He was part of the Swedish water polo team, which was able to win the bronze medal. In the 1500 metres freestyle event he was eliminated in the first round. Also he was part of the Swedish 4 x 200 metre freestyle relay team.

See also
 Dual sport and multi-sport Olympians
 List of Olympic medalists in water polo (men)

References

External links
 

1879 births
1931 deaths
Swedish male water polo players
Swedish male freestyle swimmers
Olympic water polo players of Sweden
Olympic swimmers of Sweden
Water polo players at the 1908 Summer Olympics
Swimmers at the 1908 Summer Olympics
Olympic bronze medalists for Sweden
Olympic medalists in water polo
Medalists at the 1908 Summer Olympics